National Socialist paramilitary ranks were pseudo-military titles which were used by the Nazis, represented by the Nazi Party, the National Socialist German Workers' Party (Nationalsozialistische Deutsche Arbeiterpartei; NSDAP), between the years of 1920 and 1945. Since the Nazi Party was by its very nature a paramilitary organization, by the time of the Second World War, several systems of paramilitary ranks had come into existence for both the Nazi Party itself and the various Nazi paramilitary organizations.

The following articles provide information regarding the various paramilitary rank systems used by the Nazi Party:

 Ranks and insignia of the Nazi Party
 Uniforms and insignia of the Schutzstaffel
 Uniforms and insignia of the Sturmabteilung
 Ranks and insignia of the Hitler Youth
 Ranks and insignia of the National Socialist Flyers Corps
 Ranks and insignia of the National Socialist Motor Corps
 Ranks and insignia of the Volkssturm

After the Nazi Party came to power in Germany, a number of Nazi state controlled and/or sponsored organizations developed Nazi style ranks, insignia, and titles. Such various ranks and insignia were:

 Ranks and insignia of the Ordnungspolizei
 Ranks and insignia of the Reichsarbeitsdienst
 Ranks and insignia of the Reichsluftschutzbund
 Ranks and insignia of the Reichsbahn
 Ranks and insignia of Organisation Todt
 Uniforms and insignia of the Kyffhäuserbund

The Nazi use of paramilitary ranks even extended as far as inmates of concentration camps. By 1936, a system of Nazi concentration camp badges had been developed along paramilitary lines.

 
Paramilitary ranks, Nazi Party